is a professional Japanese baseball player. He plays catcher for the Tohoku Rakuten Golden Eagles.

External links

 NPB.com

1982 births
Living people
Baseball people from Hiroshima Prefecture
Asia University (Japan) alumni
Japanese baseball players
Nippon Professional Baseball catchers
Yakult Swallows players
Tokyo Yakult Swallows players
Chiba Lotte Marines players
Tohoku Rakuten Golden Eagles players